BigBang Fanclub Event ~Fantastic Babys~ is a special fan meeting for BigBang's fan club in Japan, it's started in 2012, with four shows. The last event was held in 2016. All the members of BigBang including, G-Dragon, Sol, V.I and D-Lite attended all shows, except T.O.P who missed all shows, due to other schedules.

Events

2016 Event
In early 2016, YG Entertainment announced that BigBang will hold fan meeting events for the Japanese fan club in April, visiting four cities Kobe, Fukuoka, Nagoya and Chiba with 27 shows in total. It was announced that T.O.P will miss the fan meeting due to his movie filming. The fan meeting ended with great success after 280,000 fans came to the shows.

Dates

DVD

Bigbang Fanclub Event 2014 'Fantastic Babys' is a live DVD & Blu-ray by South Korean band Big Bang, released on February 18, 2015 in Japan only available for fans with VIP membership. The DVD/Blu-ray was filmed during the band's fan meeting in Yokohama Arena. The tour visited 4 cities with 14 shows in total.

Track listing

References

External links
 Big Bang Japanese Site
 YG Entertainment

2012 concert tours
2014 concert tours
2016 concert tours
BigBang (South Korean band) concert tours